Mike Wilton is an American volleyball coach.

Career
Wilton served in the United States Marine Corps after high school. He played basketball at Santa Barbara City College, surfed and worked in construction.  In 1969 he played volleyball with Church College of Hawaii (now Brigham Young University Hawaii.  In 1970 he became an assistant at Brigham Young University (BYU), Provo, Utah.  In 1973 he became Cal Poly-San Luis Obispo's men volleyball coach. In 1974 Wilton also served as an assistant UC Santa Barbara men's volleyball, and 1976 BYU's men's volleyball coach.  From 1978 to 1989 he was Cal Poly's women's volleyball head coach.  In 1993 he took over as Warrior Volleyball as head coach.

On April 11, 2009 Wilton announced that he was resigning from his Hawaii head coaching job. He accepted a position as a women's assistant coach at Brigham Young University.

External links 
Hawaii athletics profile

American volleyball coaches
Brigham Young University–Hawaii alumni
Brigham Young University staff
Living people
Year of birth missing (living people)
Hawaii Rainbow Warriors volleyball coaches
UC Santa Barbara Gauchos men's volleyball
BYU Cougars men's volleyball coaches
BYU Cougars women's volleyball coaches
Utah State Aggies women's volleyball
Cal Poly Mustangs coaches